The Anglican Diocese of Eha-Amufu Missionary is one of 12 within the Anglican Province of Enugu, itself one of 14 provinces within the Church of Nigeria. The current bishop is Daniel Nkemjika Olinya.

Notes

Dioceses of the Province of Enugu
 
Eha-Amufu